Carlo Catassi (born April 19, 1953) is an Italian gastroenterologist, epidemiologist, and researcher. He is notable for international studies on the epidemiology of the celiac disease. He is Head of the Department of Pediatrics at the Università Politecnica delle Marche, Ancona, Italy; Visiting Scientist at Massachusetts General Hospital in Boston, Massachusetts, United States; and 2013-2016 President of the Italian Society of Pediatric Gastroenterology, Hepatology and Nutrition (SIGENP). His research also includes contributions to understanding the clinical spectrum of celiac disease and other gluten-related disorders.

Education and career
Since 1993 he has served as a full-time Professor at the Università Politecnica Delle Marche in Ancona, Italy, where he currently holds the position of Head of the Department of Pediatrics and Director of the Pediatric Residency Program. He is married to Dr. Eleonora Bove, a lawyer. They have a son and a daughter.

Key research activities

Carlo Catassi has made contributions to the international understanding of celiac disease epidemiology. He was the main author of the first celiac disease screening project for the general population in the US. This study showed that celiac disease is much more common than previously thought, affecting around 1% of the US population, while often remaining undiagnosed (so-called celiac iceberg). His original findings have been replicated by hundreds of studies performed all over the world.  He investigated the prevalence of celiac disease in Europe, North and South America,   and Middle East countries. He and his coworkers found an extremely high prevalence of celiac disease in the Saharawi population of Arab-Berber origin  (around 6%)pointing out the importance of specific environmental and genetic factors to the disease pathophysiology.

He has conducted clinical trials aimed at clarifying the minimal amount of gluten needed to trigger the small intestinal damage in patients affected with celiac disease. These milestone studies formed the basis for fixing the maximum gluten contamination (20 ppm) allowed in gluten-free food by regulatory International Agencies like Codex Alimentarius and US-FDA. He is co-author of “Fast Facts: Celiac Disease” with Geoffrey Holmes and Alessio Fasano

In recent years his research activities have focused on understanding environmental factors affecting the risk of developing celiac disease, particularly weaning patterns and other aspects of infant nutrition, along with understanding other forms of gluten-related disorders, particularly non-celiac gluten sensitivity (NCGS). He has guided the establishment of precise diagnostic criteria of NCGS, now known as Salerno’s criteria.

Catassi and his co-workers recently have provided new insights into the age of gluten introduction for infants, along with the finding that breastfeeding does not appear to influence the risk of developing celiac disease in children.

Research studies

Four novel mutations in the lactase gene ( LCT ) underlying congenital lactase deficiency (CLD).

Celiac Disease Seems to Be on the Rise, Mainly in Elderly

Lack of association between celiac disease and dental enamel hypoplasia in a case-control study from an Italian central region

Age of gluten exposure impacts development of coeliac disease

Risk of non-Hodgkin lymphoma in celiac disease.

Coeliac disease: a potentially treatable health problem of Saharawi refugee children.

Books
 Manuale SIGENP di gastroenterologia ed epatologia pediatrica
 Frontiers in celiac disease
 The obese child
 Celiac disease in the developing world

References 

Italian gastroenterologists
Italian public health doctors
Italian statisticians
Livorno
1953 births
Living people